Mammee may refer to several New World tropical fruits or the trees which produce these fruits:
 Magnolia guatemalensis, in the family Magnoliaceae
 Mammea americana, in the family Calophyllaceae
 Pouteria sapota, in the family Sapotaceae

See also
 African mammey apple, Mammea africana